WRQE is a classic rock formatted broadcast radio station licensed to Cumberland, Maryland, serving Western Maryland, Potomac Highlands of West Virginia and the Northern Shenandoah Valley. WRQE is owned and operated by Forever Media, through licensee FM Radio Licenses, LLC.

References

External links
Rocky 106 Online
Forever Media Markets

Classic rock radio stations in the United States
RQE
Radio stations established in 1962
1962 establishments in Maryland